Elle is a  female name, which is usually pronounced "Ell", but is sometimes pronounced "Ellie". It derives from the French pronoun "elle", meaning "she". The name can also be a shortened version of names such as Eloise, Elizabeth, Eliza,  Felicia,  Amelia, Michelle, Danielle, Gabrielle and Eleanor, Leslie or Lindsey.

Persons
 Elle Fanning (born 1998), American actress
 Elle Kennedy, Canadian romantic fiction writer
 Elle King (born 1989), American singer, songwriter and actress
 Elle Macpherson (born 1964), Australian supermodel and actress
 Elle McLemore (born 1991), American actress
 Elle Mulvaney (born 2002), English child actress
 Elle Varner (born 1989), American singer
 Elle Winter (born 1999), American singer, songwriter and actress
 Elle Johnson (born 1990) American Bikini Supermodel from Park City, Utah

Characters
 Elle Bishop, from the U.S. TV series Heroes
 Elle Driver, from the film Kill Bill
 Elle Evans, from the film The Kissing Booth'
 Elle Greenaway, from the TV series Criminal Minds Elle McFeast, Australian television character created by comedian Libbi Gorr
 Elle Robinson, from the Australian soap opera Neighbours Elle Woods, from the film Legally Blonde and sequels and adaptations
 Elle Tomkins, from the TV series The Society
 Elle Argent, from the Netflix TV series Heartstopper''

Given names
Feminine given names
English feminine given names
Hypocorisms